Scattergories  is a creative-thinking category-based party game originally published by Parker Brothers in 1988. Parker Brothers was purchased by Hasbro a few years later, which published the game internationally under its Milton Bradley brand. The objective of the 2-to-6-player game is to score points by uniquely naming objects within a set of categories, given an initial letter, within a time limit. The game is based on a traditional game called "Categories".

Gameplay
The game is played in sets of 3 rounds.
 Each player takes a folder with an answering pad and 3 category cards.  Each sheet in the answering pad has three columns of 12 blank lines. In addition, the category cards have 4 lists, each with 12 unique categories, for a total of 144 categories in the game. In new versions of the game, each card has 2 lists of 12 unique categories, for a total of 16 lists and 192 categories.  All players must agree on the list to use.
 One player rolls a 20-sided letter die to determine the first letter used.  The timer is set for up to three minutes.
 One player starts the timer. In the time allotted, each player must attempt to think of and write down, in the first column on the pad, a word or term that fits each of the 12 categories and starts with the rolled letter. Any number of words in the answer is allowed, as long as the first word starts with the correct letter. For example, with a category of "vegetable" and a letter of "C", words such as "cauliflower", "carrot" and "collard greens" are acceptable, but "broccoli" is not (wrong initial letter), nor is "citrus" (wrong category). Alliteration is encouraged with proper nouns in one game variation; Ronald Reagan is worth 2 points, and Hubert Horatio Humphrey is worth 3.
 Writing a bad answer is still better than no answer though because there is always the possibility that the group playing will accept the answer.  For example, "citrus" is "vegetable" in the sense referring to the entire plant kingdom, i.e. neither "animal" nor "mineral".
 All players stop writing when the timer is finished. Following the list, each player, in turn, reads their answer for each category. Players score zero points for an answer that duplicates another answer in that round, and one point for an answer no other player has given. You cannot have more than one answer on a line for each number. Acceptable answers that are proper nouns using alliteration score one point for each word using the letter. (In the "Junior" version, players earn 2 points for an answer that begins with the chosen letter, and 1 point for an answer that does not begin with the chosen letter, but no points for a duplicate answer.)
 If for some reason a player thinks someone's answer does not fit the category (for instance, "knuckle" for the category "types of sandwich") a player may challenge that answer. When challenged, all players vote on the validity of that answer. If the vote is a tie, the vote of the player who is being challenged is thrown out.
 The die is rolled again (and re-rolled if the same letter as the previous round is duplicated), and the second round starts.
 In the case of proper nouns, all parts of the answer will be counted as adequate provided one begins with the letter in play.  For example, in the case of U.S. Presidents using the letter "S", an acceptable answer would be Harry S. Truman, as his middle name is the letter "S."  Martin Sheen, however, was never a U.S. President, and therefore is not a valid answer, rewarding zero points.  Note: This rule does not apply to book titles, such as "The Old Man and the Sea."
 In the case of general categories, broad interpretation is allowed for fun and creative game play. For example, in the case of things commonly found in the kitchen that start with the letter K, both knife (a kitchen tool) and kelp (a type of food that is commonly cooked in kitchens around the world) are acceptable answers.

Later versions

In 1989, Milton Bradley published a "refill" pack for Scattergories. It consists of 18 cards with 144 new categories and contains 6 new answer pads. 

In 2008, Winning Moves Games USA published Scattergories The Card Game. It is a fast-playing, portable game of Scattergories. (It is not a booster pack.) The game includes a deck of letter cards, a deck of category cards and 2 "I Know" cards. Players turn over the top card in the letter deck and category deck and the first person to shout out a correct answer takes a card. For example, if an "S" is turned over and "The Beach" is turned over...if someone slaps the "I Know" card and says "I Know! Sand." That player claims either card and turns over a new letter or subject card (depending on what they claimed.) The game ends when one entire deck is exhausted. The player with the most cards wins.

In January 2010, Puzzlewright Press  published "Scattergories Word Search Puzzles" by Mark Danna, a former associate editor at Games magazine. Sanctioned by Hasbro, this book provides Scattergories players a way to play a solitaire version of the game with the following variations: write down two answers, not just one, for every category; instead of coming up with unique answers, try to match answers, which are hidden in a word search; score bonus points by matching answers hidden in the word search grid's leftover letters. There are no rounds. Players try to beat their most recent or their best score. Categories in the book are based on the ones in the board game but have modifications. There are 60 puzzle games in all.

In 2010, Winning Moves Games USA published "Scattergories Categories" which is a twist on classic Scattergories play.  Instead of finding answers that all start with one letter, Scattergories Categories focuses on one category per round and players race to find a unique answer starting with each letter in the category key word, which is related to the category in some way.  As the game box shows, if the category word is "CAMPING TRIP" players have 2 minutes to find a word that starts with a C, then an A, then an M, and a P... and so on.  Players get 1 point for each unique answer and the first player to 25 points wins.  The game contains 250 word challenges on 125 cards for players 12 and up.

In 2019, Winning Moves Games USA published "Scattergories 30th Anniversary Edition. It is a classic reproduction of the original 1989 edition. It includes all original categories and components, including the mechanical timer with three different time settings, 6 folders, 6 answer pads, and multi-sided oversized die.

Game show version

Scattergories became an NBC game show in 1993 hosted by Dick Clark. It ran right after Scrabble and featured Chuck Woolery as a regular panelist.

Mobile version
Scattergories was released to the iTunes App Store in 2015. The game was developed by Magmic and licensed through Hasbro.

References

External links
 Scattergories Mobile on iTunes
 Le Jeu du Bac, the French version of the game, on Facebook 
 Scattergories online multiplayer version
 liste-mots.com, french dictionary 

Mensa Select winners
Word games
Milton Bradley Company games
Games and sports introduced in 1988